Acacia cheelii, commonly known as motherumbah or motherumbung, is a tree belonging to the genus Acacia and the subgenus Juliflorae that is native to eastern Australia.

Description
It has ribbony or flaky bark that is a red-brown to brownish colour. The angular red-brown or brown coloured glabrous branchlets become flattened towards the apex and have a white powdery coating. Like most species of Acacia it has phyllodes rather than true leaves. It blooms between August and late October producing golden coloured flowers.

Taxonomy
The specific epithet honours Edwin Cheel who once worked for the National Herbarium of New South Wales.

Distribution
It is endemic to the north-western slopes of the Great Dividing Range and the north western plains of New South Wales and it also found in the Hunter Valley region where it is usually situated on stony or rocky hilltops and hillsides growing in skeletal or sandy soils. as a part of Eucalyptus woodland or scrubland communities. It is found from around Murrurundi in the south to around the Warrumbungle Mountain and Pilliga Scrub in the west to around Torrington and Warialda in the north.

See also
List of Acacia species

References

cheelii
Flora of New South Wales
Taxa named by William Blakely
Plants described in 1917